Joseph Anton Merz (1681 – 7 January 1750) was a German Baroque painter.

Merz was born in Marktoberdorf, in Swabia. He was active until 1734, mainly around Straubing, in Bavaria, and predominantly painted altarpieces and frescos. His better known works include a fresco cycle in the Oberalteich Abbey, and the ceiling fresco of the Church of St. John of Nepomuk in Thürnthenning (now in greater Moosthenning).

References
 

1681 births
1750 deaths
People from Marktoberdorf
German Baroque painters
Fresco painters